The Springfield Jr. Blues are a Tier II junior ice hockey team in the North American Hockey League's Midwest Division. The team plays their home games at the Nelson Center in Springfield, Illinois.

History
Founded by John D. O'Laughlin and Al Jennings, the franchise joined the North American Hockey League for the 1993–94 season. Springfield had previously been home to multiple semi-pro teams the Springfield Kings and Springfield Capitols. The team has made numerous appearances in the NAHL playoffs and were back-to-back Robertson Cup National Championships in 1996 and 1997.

Due to the ongoing COVID-19 pandemic that curtailed the 2019–20 season, the Jr. Blues suspended operations for the 2020–21 season.

Season-by-season records

Playoff records

References

External links 
Official site

North American Hockey League teams
Jr. Blues
Amateur ice hockey teams in Illinois
Ice hockey clubs established in 1993
1993 establishments in Illinois